The 1910 New York Giants season was the franchise's 28th season. The team finished in second place in the National League with a 91–63 record, 13 games behind the Chicago Cubs.

The Giants offense scored the most runs in the NL. Fred Snodgrass had his breakthrough season, finishing fourth in the batting race and also leading the team in on-base percentage and OPS.

Their pitching staff was once again led by Hall of Famer Christy Mathewson, who won a league-best 27 games. His 1.89 earned run average ranked third.

Regular season

Season standings

Record vs. opponents

Roster

Player stats

Batting

Starters by position 
Note: Pos = Position; G = Games played; AB = At bats; H = Hits; Avg. = Batting average; HR = Home runs; RBI = Runs batted in

Other batters 
Note: G = Games played; AB = At bats; H = Hits; Avg. = Batting average; HR = Home runs; RBI = Runs batted in

Pitching

Starting pitchers 
Note: G = Games pitched; IP = Innings pitched; W = Wins; L = Losses; ERA = Earned run average; SO = Strikeouts

Other pitchers 
Note: G = Games pitched; IP = Innings pitched; W = Wins; L = Losses; ERA = Earned run average; SO = Strikeouts

Relief pitchers 
Note: G = Games pitched; W = Wins; L = Losses; SV = Saves; ERA = Earned run average; SO = Strikeouts

Awards and honors

League top ten finishers 
Red Ames
 #4 in NL in ERA (2.22)

Larry Doyle
 #4 in NL in runs scored (97)

Louis Drucke
 #4 in NL in strikeouts (151)

Christy Mathewson
 NL leader in wins (27)
 #2 in NL in strikeouts (184)
 #3 in NL in ERA (1.89)

Fred Merkle
 #4 in NL in slugging percentage (.441)

Red Murray
 #2 in NL in stolen bases (57)
 #3 in NL in RBI (87)

Fred Snodgrass
 #2 in NL in on-base percentage (.440)
 #4 in NL in batting average (.321)

External links
1910 New York Giants season at Baseball Reference

New York Giants (NL)
San Francisco Giants seasons
New York Giants season
New York G
1910s in Manhattan
Washington Heights, Manhattan